Letim, sanjam, dišem (literal translation:I fly, I dream, I breathe) is the sixth studio album by Serbian/Yugoslavian new wave band Električni orgazam. It was released in 1988 by PGP RTB.

Track listing
All songs written by Srđan Gojković except where noted. Arranged by Električni Orgazam.

"Ova Strana" (This Side)
	 	"Igra Rok' En' Rol cela Jugoslavija"
	 	"Svi Ljudi I Sve Žene"
	 	"Ti"
	 	"Sve što radim, radim za nju"
	 	"Kad sve devojke budu moje"

"Ona Strana" (That Side)
 		"Poljubi me i priznaj mi"
	 	"(Hajde bejbe) Daj da vidim sad"
	 	"Ona uvek želi sve"
	 	"Sve ste vi naše devojke" (drums — Piko Stančić)
	 	"Sunce zna da Mesec zna"

Personnel
Švaba (Zoran Radomirović) — bass guitar
Čavke (Goran Čavajda) — drums, backing vocals
Anton (Nebojša Antonijević) — guitar
Banana (Branislav Petrović) — guitar, backing vocals
Gile (Srđan Gojković) — guitar, lead vocals
Saša Lokner — keyboards

External links
Letim, sanjam, dišem at Discogs

Električni Orgazam albums
1988 albums
PGP-RTB albums